The artistic movement known as Los Disidentes was founded in Paris in 1945, lasting until about 1950. It was composed of a group of Venezuelan artists.

Artistic principles 
The "Manifesto No" was the group's manifesto of artistic principles, which was written and published in Paris on 30 June 1950 by artists Rafael Zapata, Bernardo Chataing, Régulo Pérez, Guevara Moreno and Omar Carreño.

Major contributions to art from the group include beginning experiments in neo-figurative art, abstract art, and other waves of contemporary art; breaking away from figurativism, and renewing traditional Venezuelan painting marked by the trend of the El Círculo de Bellas Artes and the Landscape School of Caracas, which they were highly critical of.

Works and activities 
The group also published a magazine of the same name, which only had five editions. This publication served to show what was more radical art at the time: the so-called geometric abstractionism, as a rejection of traditional art forms.

Members 
Members included:
 Jesús Soto
 Alejandro Otero
 Mateo Manaure
 Narciso Debourg
 Pascual Navarro
 Alirio Oramas
 Perán Erminy
 Carlos Gonzáles Bogen
 Armando Barrios
 Genaro Moreno
 Nena Palacios
 Omar Carreño
 Dora Hersen
 Luis Guevara Moreno
 Aimée Battistini
 J. R. Guillent Pérez
 Rubén Núñez
 Miguel Arroyo
 Oswaldo Vigas
 Régulo Pérez

See also 
 Modern art

References

1945 in France

History of Paris
Venezuelan art
Venezuelan artists